Alexander Rice may refer to:

 Alexander H. Rice (1818–1895), American politician and businessman from Massachusetts
 Alexander H. Rice Jr. (1875–1956), American physician, geographer, geologist and explorer
 Alexander Talbot Rice (born 1969), British society portrait artist